Breaking Bad is an American television series.

Breaking Bad may also refer to:

 Breaking Bad (franchise), the larger franchise
 "Breaking Bad" (Better Call Saul), an episode of spinoff series Better Call Saul
 "Pilot" (Breaking Bad), titled "Breaking Bad" on DVD and Blu-ray releases
 Breaking Bad: Criminal Elements, a mobile game developed by FTX Games based on the series
 El Camino: A Breaking Bad Movie, a 2019 film sequel to the series

See also 
 Better Call Saul (disambiguation)